Bellingwedde was a municipality with a population of  in the province Groningen in the northeast of the Netherlands. Bellingwedde was established in 1968, when the municipalities of Bellingwolde and Wedde had merged. It contained the villages Bellingwolde, Blijham, Oudeschans, Veelerveen, Vriescheloo, and Wedde. After almost 50 year, Bellingwedde was disestablished in 2018, when the municipalities of Bellingwedde and Vlagtwedde had merged into Westerwolde.

Etymology 
The name Bellingwedde is a portmanteau of Bellingwolde and Wedde, which are the names of the two municipalities that were merged in 1968 to form Bellingwedde. At the time, three names were being considered for the new municipality: Bellingewedde as proposed by the province of Groningen, Bellingwolde-Wedde as proposed by the municipal council of Bellingwolde, and Bellingwedde as proposed by the municipal council of Wedde. The province selected the last option, which was eventually also accepted by the municipal council of Bellingwolde.

History 
On 1 September 1968, the municipality Bellingwedde was formed by merging the municipalities of Bellingwolde and Wedde.

Henk Eijsink of the Labour Party, who was the last mayor of Bellingwolde and acting mayor of Wedde, became the first mayor of Bellingwedde in 1968–1970. He was followed by Jurjen Jan Hoeksema (Labour Party; 1970–1978), Engbert Drenth (Labour Party; 1979–2007), Erik Triemstra (Christian Democratic Appeal; 2007–2013), and Janneke Snijder-Hazelhoff (People's Party for Freedom and Democracy; 2013–2018).

The municipality has merged with Vlagtwedde into the new municipality of Westerwolde on 1 January 2018.

Geography 

It is in the south of the region of Oldambt and in the north of the region of Westerwolde.

Bellingwedde is bordered by the Dutch municipalities of Oldambt (in the north), Pekela (west), Stadskanaal (south-west), and Vlagtwedde (south), and by the German municipalities of Rhede (south-east) and Bunde (north-east). The nearest city is Winschoten.

The municipality contains the villages Bellingwolde, Blijham, Oudeschans, Veelerveen, Vriescheloo, and Wedde. It also contains the hamlets Den Ham, Klein-Ulsda, Rhederbrug, and Wedderveer.

The north border of the municipality follows the river Pekel Aa. The river Westerwoldse Aa crosses the east of Bellingwedde from south to north. The canal B.L. Tijdenskanaal, that unites the Mussel-Aa-kanaal and the Ruiten-Aa-kanaal in the south, crosses the west of Bellingwedde from south to north.

Governance 
A municipal government in the Netherlands consists of the executive college of the mayor and aldermen and the elected municipal council. The municipal building is located at the Hoofdweg in Wedde.

Janneke Snijder-Hazelhoff of the People's Party for Freedom and Democracy has been the appointed mayor of Bellingwedde since 2013.

The municipal council consists of 13 elected members. In the 2014 municipal elections the turnout in Bellingwedde was 57.57% with 4,191 valid votes. The Socialist Party got the most votes, followed by the Labour Party, the Christian Democratic Appeal, and the People's Party for Freedom and Democracy.

A coalition was formed between the Labour Party (PvdA), the Christian Democratic Appeal (CDA), and the People's Party for Freedom and Democracy (VVD). All three parties have one alderman in the college of mayor and aldermen: Bart Huizing (PvdA), Lea van der Tuin (CDA), and Wim 't Mannetje (VVD). Although the Socialist Party got the most electoral votes, it is not part of the coalition.

|-style="background:#E9E9E9;"
!colspan="2" align="left"|Party
!Votes
!%
!Seats
|-
|bgcolor=""|
|align="left"| Socialist Party
| 1,116
| 26.63
|align="center"| 3
|-
|bgcolor=""|
|align="left"| Labour Party
| 853
| 20.35
|align="center"| 3
|-
|bgcolor=""|
|align="left"|Christian Democratic Appeal
| 572
| 13.65
|align="center"| 2
|-
|bgcolor=""|
|align="left"|People's Party for Freedom and Democracy
| 531
| 12.67
|align="center"| 2
|-
|bgcolor=""|
|align="left"| GreenLeft
| 493
| 11.76
|align="center"| 1
|-
|
|align="left"| Plaatselijk Belang Bellingwedde
| 355
| 8.47
|align="center"| 1
|-
|
|align="left"| Westerwolde Lokaal
| 271
| 6.47
|align="center"| 1
|-
|-style="background:#E9E9E9;"
!colspan="2" align="left"|Total
!4,191
!100
!align="center"|13
|}

Bellingwedde is twinned with Rhede in Germany since 1979 and Nowogród Bobrzański in Poland since 2004.

Demographics 

Since 1968, when the municipality was established, Bellingwedde had a population between 8,561 and 9,748.

Attractions 

Two villages have a state protected village area, Oudeschans since 1991 and Bellingwolde since 2009.

There are two museums in Bellingwedde. Museum de Oude Wolden in Bellingwolde is a regional museum about the art and history of Oldambt and Westerwolde. It has temporary exhibitions and a permanent exhibition with paintings of Lodewijk Bruckman from the municipal collection of Bellingwedde. Vestingmuseum Oudeschans in Oudeschans is a history museum about the fortification of Oudeschans. It has a collection of archaeological findings from the 17th and 18th century on display.

There are five windmills in the municipality: De Korenbloem in Vriescheloo, Niemans Molen in Veelerveen, Spinnenkop Wedderveer in Wedderveer, Veldkamps Meuln in Bellingwolde, and Weddermarke in Wedde.

The Wedderborg is a borg, a type of castle from the province of Groningen, in Wedde. The building has 14th, 15th, and 16th-century elements and is currently used as a hotel and restaurant.

Infrastructure

Roads 

There are no highways in Bellingwedde. The nearest highway is the A7 (E22) directly north of the municipality and which is connected to Groningen in the west and Leer (Germany) in the east; its nearest access point is exit 48 (Oudeschans).

There are four provincial roads in the municipality. In the northwest, the N367 connects the municipality to Winschoten and Oude and Nieuwe Pekela. The N368 runs from northwest to southwest, connects Blijham via Wedde to Vlagtwedde, and also connects to the other three major roads. The N969 runs from west to southeast and connects Blijham via Bellingwolde and Rhederbrug to Rhede in Germany. And the N973 runs from southwest to the center and connects Wedde via Vriescheloo to Bellingwolde.

Public transport 
There are also no railways in Bellingwedde. The nearest railway stations are Winschoten and Bad Nieuweschans on the Harlingen–Nieuweschans railway just north of Bellingwedde. The railway is connected to the Groningen railway station and the rest of the Dutch railway network in the west and to the Leer railway station and the German railway network in the east.

The bus lines passing through Bellingwedde are exploited by Qbuzz (places in Bellingwedde are in italics):
 Line 11: Winschoten – Blijham – Wedderveer – Wedde – Veele – Vlagtwedde – Bourtange
 Line 12: Winschoten – Blijham – Bellingwolde – Blijham – Winschoten
 Line 14: Stadskanaal – Alteveer – Tange – Onstwedde – Barlage – Smeerling – Vlagtwedde – Veele – Wedde – Wedderveer – Blijham – Winschoten
 Line 811: Bad Nieuweschans – Klein-Ulsda – Oudeschans – Bellingwolde – Vriescheloo – Veelerveen – Vlagtwedde

Education 
There are four preschools, seven primary schools, and one secondary school in Bellingwedde. There are no institutes of tertiary education in the municipality.

Media 
Het Streekblad is a free door-to-door weekly newspaper in the municipalities of Bellingwedde, Oldambt, and Pekela. Dagblad van het Noorden is a daily newspaper in the northern provinces of the Netherlands.

Radio Westerwolde is a radio channel in the municipalities of Bellingwedde, Pekela, and Vlagtwedde.

Notable people 
 Jan Mulder (born 1945 in Bellingwolde), footballer, writer, and commentator

References

External links 

  (in Dutch)

Westerwolde (municipality)
Former municipalities of Groningen (province)
Municipalities of the Netherlands disestablished in 2018